Gangsta may refer to:

Urban culture

 Gangsta rap, a subgenre of hip hop music that evolved from hardcore hip hop and purports to reflect urban crime and the violent lifestyles of inner-city youths
 Gangster, a member of a gang
 Hip hop fashion, a style of dress associated with gangsta rap and other hip hop genres

People 
 Gangsta Boo (1979-2023), first female member of the Memphis, Tennessee-based rap group Three 6 Mafia
 Gangsta Pat (born 1972), American rapper from Memphis, Tennessee who established himself in the Memphis underground during the late 1980s
 The Gangstas, former professional wrestling tag team and stable
 Gangsta, American rapper signed to No Limit Forever Records
 Z-Gangsta (1958–2020), later stage name for American actor and retired professional wrestler Tommy Lister Jr.

Films and television
 Gangsta Girls, a 2004 Vietnamese film directed by Le Hoang
 Gangsta (manga), a Japanese manga and anime series
 Gangsta (film), a 2018 Belgian crime movie

Music

Songs
 "Gangsta" (Bell Biv DeVoe song), 1993
 "Gangsta" (Kat Dahlia song), 2013
 "Gangsta" (Schoolboy Q song), 2014
 "Gangsta" (Slim Thug song), 2010
 "Gangsta" (Kehlani song), 2016
 "Gangsta?" (Tinchy Stryder song), 2010 Tinchy Stryder song
 "Gangsta", a song by Akon featuring Daddy T, Picklehead and Devyne from Trouble
 "Gangsta", a song by Tune-Yards from Whokill
 "Gangsta", a song by Royce da 5'9" from Death Is Certain
 "Gangsta", a song by Yelawolf from Trunk Muzik Returns
 "Gangsta", a song by Young Dro from Best Thang Smokin'
 "Gangsta (Love 4 the Streets)", a 2001 song by Lil' Mo from Based on a True Story
 "Gangsta Bitch", a 1993 song from Apache's debut album, Apache Ain't Shit

See also 
 
 Gangsta Gangsta (disambiguation)
 Gangsta's Paradise (disambiguation)
 Gangster (disambiguation)